Daniela Campuzano Chávez Peón (born 21 October 1986) is a Mexican mountain biker who qualified for the 2016 Summer Olympics held in Rio de Janeiro, Brazil. She carried the Mexican flag at the opening ceremony during the Parade of Nations.

Personal life
Campuzano was born on 21 October 1986 in Mexico City, Mexico. She has a university degree in biology from the Autonomous University of Hidalgo State.

Mountain biking career
Campuzano began mountain biking in 1998.

In the women's cross country event at the 2011 Pan American Games in Guadalajara, Jalisco, Mexico, she finished in ninth position.

At the 2013 Pan American cross country championships, held in Puebla, Mexico, she won the gold medal. She won the women's cross country event at the 2014 Central American and Caribbean Games held in Veracruz, Mexico, taking the gold medal in a time of one hour 23 minutes and 30 seconds. She won another gold medal at the Pan American cross country championships at the 2014 event in Brazil. At the 2014 UCI Mountain Bike & Trials World Championships held in Lillehammer, Norway she finished 14th in the women's cross country.

Campuzano won the Pan American cross country championships for the third time at the 2015 event in Cota, Colombia. In doing so she earned qualification for the 2016 Summer Olympics in Rio de Janeiro, Brazil. She competed at her second Pan American Games at the 2015 Games held in Toronto, Ontario, Canada. In the women's cross country she finished just outside of the medal in fourth place in a time of one hour 34 minutes 11 seconds.

In the 2016 UCI Mountain Bike World Cup she placed 16th in the event held in La Bresse, France, in a time of one hour 34 minutes and 23 seconds.

In May 2016 Mario Garcia de la Torre, head of the Mexican delegation, announced that Campuzano would carry the Mexican flag during the Parade of Nations at the opening ceremony. She competed in the women's cross-country event on 20 August. She was the first mountain biker to represent Mexico at an Olympic Games by finishing 16th

References

Living people
1986 births
Cross-country mountain bikers
Sportspeople from Mexico City
Mexican female cyclists
Olympic cyclists of Mexico
Cyclists at the 2016 Summer Olympics
Pan American Games medalists in cycling
Pan American Games gold medalists for Mexico
Cyclists at the 2011 Pan American Games
Cyclists at the 2015 Pan American Games
Cyclists at the 2019 Pan American Games
Medalists at the 2019 Pan American Games
Cyclists at the 2020 Summer Olympics
Competitors at the 2014 Central American and Caribbean Games
Competitors at the 2018 Central American and Caribbean Games